The  is a skyscraper located in Takamatsu, Kagawa Prefecture, Japan. Construction of the 151-metre, 30-story skyscraper was finished in 2001.

External links

 
 

Commercial buildings completed in 2001
Takamatsu, Kagawa
Skyscrapers in Japan
Buildings and structures in Kagawa Prefecture
2001 establishments in Japan